1985 saw the dawn of another new era in Saudi Arabian football with the league once again cut into two groups.

Al-Ta'ee were once again promoted, replacing city neighbours Al Jabalain who were relegated the previous season.

The winners and runners up of each six team group advanced to the finals phase to crown a champion, of which Al-Hilal won and defended the championship.

Teams finishing third and fourth in the group phases then played off for classification purposes and the teams finishing 5th and 6th played out a relegation pool. Newly promoted Al Kawkab were relegated along with Al-Riyadh.

Stadia and locations

League tables

Group A

Group B

Championship pool

Classification pool

Relegation pool

Promoted: Al-Raed, Al-Ansar
Full records not currently known

External links 
 RSSSF Stats
 Saudi Arabia Football Federation
 Saudi League Statistics
 Article writer for Saleh Al-Hoireny - Al-Jazirah newspaper 17-09-2010

Saudi Premier League seasons
Professional League
Saudi Professional League